Bai Jinbin is a Hui, Chinese Sanda kickboxer who was born on November 1, 1985 in Heze, Shandong, China and graduated from the Beijing Shichahai Sports School. As of November 2015, he is ranked the #10 Welterweight in the world by Combat Press. As of December 2015, he is ranked the #10 Welterweight in the world by LiverKick.

Championships and awards 

 Kickboxing
 2014 WLF World champion -80 kg

 Sanda
 2005 National Club League Sanda Championship  -80 kg
 2006 Chinese Wushu Sanda Club Championship  -80 kg
 2007 KFK Wushu International tournament Champion -80 kg
 2008 4th Wushu Sanda World Cup Champion -80 kg
 2009 Chinese Sports Medal of Honour

Kickboxing Record

|-
|-  bgcolor="#FFBBBB"
| 2015-08-15 || Loss || align=left| Surik Magakyan || Kunlun Fight 29 || Sochi, Russia || Decision (Unanimous) || 3 || 3:00
|-
|-  bgcolor="#CCFFCC"
| 2015-07-19 || Win || align=left| Alexander Stetsurenko || Kunlun Fight 28 || Nanjing, China || Decision (Unanimous) || 3 || 3:00
|-
|-  bgcolor="#CCFFCC"
| 2015-04-18 || Win || align=left| Alka Matewa || CKF || Changde, China || Decision (Unanimous) || 3 || 3:00
|-
|-  bgcolor="#CCFFCC"
| 2015-04-12 || Win || align=left| Saeid Chahardouli || Kunlun Fight 22 || Changde, China || Decision (Unanimous) || 3 || 3:00
|-
|-  bgcolor="#FFBBBB"
| 2015-02-01 || Loss ||align=left| Artur Kyshenko || Kunlun Fight 18 || Guangzhou, China || KO (Right Hook) || 1 || 2:48
|-
|-  bgcolor="#CCFFCC"
| 2014-08-24 || Win ||align=left| Kim Dea-hyeon || Kunlun Fight 13 || Hohhot, China || KO || 3 || 
|-
|-  bgcolor="#CCFFCC"
| 2014-08-24 || Win ||align=left| Nuerla Mulali || Kunlun Fight 8 ||Xining, China || KO (Left High Kick) || 3 || 1:27
|-
! style=background:white colspan=9 |Wins the Wu Lin Feng World Championship -80 kg. 
|-
|-  bgcolor="#CCFFCC"
| 2008-11-24 || Win || align="left" | Aotegen Bateer || 2008 Chinese Wushu Sanda Kung Fu King Competition || Harbin, China || TKO || 2 || 
|-
|-  bgcolor="#CCFFCC"
| 2007-03-25 || Win || align="left" | Fang Bian || 2007 KFK Wushu International tournament || Chongqing, China || Decision (Unanimous) || 3 || 3:00 
|-
! style=background:white colspan=9 |Wins the Wu KFK Wushu International tournament -80 kg. 
|-
|-  bgcolor="#CCFFCC"
| 2007-03-23 || Win || align=left| Muslim Salikhov || 2nd Kung Fu King Tournament (国际武术搏击争霸赛), Semi Finals || Chongqing, China || Decision (Unanimous) || 3 || 3:00
|- 
|-
| colspan=9 | Legend:

References

1985 births
Living people
Chinese male kickboxers
People from Heze
Sportspeople from Shandong
Welterweight kickboxers
Hui sportspeople